Heliocheilus albivenata is a moth in the family Noctuidae. It is endemic to Western Australia.

Larvae have been recorded on male flowers of  Spinifex longifolius.

References

External links
Australian Faunal Directory

Heliocheilus
Moths of Australia